Golitsyno is a town in Odintsovsky District of Moscow Oblast, Russia, located  west of Moscow. Population:

History
It was founded as a settlement in 1872 and was granted town status in 2004.

Administrative and municipal status
Within the framework of administrative divisions, it is, together with six rural localities, incorporated within Odintsovsky District as the Town of Golitsyno. As a municipal division, the Town of Golitsyno is incorporated within Odintsovsky Municipal District as Golitsyno Urban Settlement.

Transportation

A railway station of the same name on the Moscow–Minsk railway is located in Golitsyno.

Education
There are two schools and Viaziomy Castle.

References

Notes

Sources

External links

Golitsyno Business Directory jsprav.ru 

Cities and towns in Moscow Oblast
Odintsovsky District